Urophora spoliata is a species of tephritid or fruit flies in the genus Urophora of the family Tephritidae.

Distribution
Britain, Slovakia, Hungary, Switzerland

References

Urophora
Insects described in 1838
Diptera of Europe